Rebecca Neaves (born 20 February 1997) is an Australian rules footballer who played for the Western Bulldogs in the AFL Women's competition. Neaves was recruited by the Western Bulldogs as a free agent in October 2016. She made her debut in the thirty-two point win against  at VU Whitten Oval in the opening round of the 2017 season. She played five matches in her debut season. She was delisted at the conclusion of the 2017 season. She is now a highly regarded podiatrist.

References

External links 

1997 births
Living people
Western Bulldogs (AFLW) players
Australian rules footballers from Victoria (Australia)
Victorian Women's Football League players